Leonardo Pulcini (born 25 June 1998, in Rome) is an Italian racing driver and the 2016 Euroformula Open champion.

Career

Karting
Born in Rome, Pulcini began karting professionally in 2012 and came second in the CIK-FIA KF Junior championship a year later.

Lower Formulae
In 2014, Pulcini graduated to single-seaters, competing with DAV Racing in the inaugural season of the Italian F4 Championship, where he finished fourth. He also partook in two rounds of that year's Euroformula Open Championship with the same team.

In 2015, Pulcini switched to Euroformula Open full-time with DAV Racing, scoring his maiden victory at the first race at the Red Bull Ring and finished ninth in the standings. He also partook in the first round of the 2015 Auto GP Series.

The following year he switched to Campos Racing. With them, he took seven victories, three pole positions and eight fastest laps to secure the Euroformula Open title.

GP3 Series
In November 2016, it was announced that Pulcini would reunite with Campos for GP3 Series post-season testing at Yas Marina. In January 2017, Pulcini signed to race with Arden International. A second place in the first round at Catalunya would end up being his only points-scoring finish and the Italian ended up 14th in the championship.

For 2018 Pulcini moved to Campos Racing in what would be the final season of the GP3 Series. His results were much better, and after two race wins and three further podiums Pulcini finished fourth in the drivers' standings.

Sports car racing
Ahead of the 2023 season, Pulcini was named a Lamborghini factory driver. His first assignment was a customer racing drive in the GT World Challenge Europe Endurance Cup with Iron Lynx. His co-drivers in the Gold Cup class were Rolf Ineichen and Michele Beretta.

Racing record

Career summary 

‡ Position when season was cancelled.
† As Pulcini was a guest driver, he was ineligible for points.

Complete Italian F4 Championship results 
(key) (Races in bold indicate pole position) (Races in italics indicate fastest lap)

Complete GP3 Series results
(key) (Races in bold indicate pole position) (Races in italics indicate fastest lap)

† Driver did not finish the race, but was classified as he completed over 90% of the race distance.

Complete FIA Formula 3 Championship results
(key) (Races in bold indicate pole position; races in italics indicate points for the fastest lap of top ten finishers)

Complete Macau Grand Prix results

References

External links

1998 births
Living people
Racing drivers from Rome
Italian racing drivers
Italian F4 Championship drivers
Auto GP drivers
Italian GP3 Series drivers
FIA Formula 3 Championship drivers
Carlin racing drivers
Arden International drivers
Euroformula Open Championship drivers
International GT Open drivers
Campos Racing drivers
Hitech Grand Prix drivers
Euronova Racing drivers
Karting World Championship drivers
Fortec Motorsport drivers
Lamborghini Super Trofeo drivers
Iron Lynx drivers